Thomas Hearns vs. James Kinchen was a professional boxing match contested on November 4, 1988, for the NABF and the inaugural WBO super middleweight titles.

Background
Following his upset loss against Iran Barkley in June 1988, 4–division world champion looked to quickly rebound by challenging WBA super middleweight champion Fulgencio Obelmejias in an effort to win his fifth world title in a fifth different weight class. However, Obelmejias withdrew only weeks before the fight citing a rib injury and was replaced by James Kinchen.

The switch from Obelmejias to Kinchen briefly put Hearns quest for a fifth world title in doubt as Kinchen only held the lower-regarded NABF super middleweight title rather than a world title from the major sanctioning bodies. This was rectified when promoter Bob Arum announced two days before the fight that the newly formed World Boxing Organization would sanction the fight for their inaugural super middleweight title.

The Hearns–Kinchen fight was the main event of a fight card dubbed Superfights which also featured IBF middleweight champion Michael Nunn successfully defending his title against Juan Roldán and Robert Hines besting IBF light middleweight champion Matthew Hilton to capture that title.

The fight
Though Hearns entered the fight as a sizable favorite over the virtually unknown Kinchen, Kinchen would prove to be a formidable opponent; having Hearns in trouble several times throughout the fight. Kinchen would score the fight's lone knockdown, doing so midway through the fourth round after landing consecutive overhand rights. After Hearns got back up and continued the fight, Kinchen would continue his assault forcing Hearns to clinch. Hearns would disregard referee Mills Lane's orders and had to be forcefully separated by Lane resulting in Lane taking a deducting a point from Hearns after the round. By the end of the fight's full 12 rounds, Hearns' right eye was nearly closed shut though two judges felt he had done enough to win, scoring the fight in his favor at 116–112 and 115–112 while the third had it even 114–114 giving Hearns the majority decision victory.

Fight card

References

1988 in boxing
Boxing matches
1988 in sports in Nevada
Boxing in Las Vegas
November 1988 sports events in the United States